Neopetrosia subtriangularis is a species of marine petrosiid sponges native to the waters off Florida and the Caribbean Sea. They superficially resemble staghorn corals.

Taxonomy
Neopetrosia subtriangularis was originally described by the French naturalist Édouard Placide Duchassaing de Fontbressin in 1850 as Spongia subtriangularis. It is classified under the genus Neopetrosia of the family Petrosiidae in the order Haplosclerida.

Description
Neopetrosia subtriangularis superficially resemble the staghorn coral (Acropora cervicornis) in appearance. They form clusters of interconnecting solid branches that tend to sprawl along the substrate (repent), though these branches may sometimes be solitary (arising from a flattened base) and erect.

The branches are brown, beige, yellow or orange in coloration on the external surfaces, though they may possess a greenish tinge. Internal surfaces are tan to off-white in coloration. They are hard in consistency, but are brittle and easily break off. The surface of the branches are smooth and flat.

They are distributed regularly on the upper surface of the branches, forming neat rows. Individual oscules may sometimes fuse together to form a crest. The spicules are curved cylinders, with pointed (oxea) or rounded (strongyloxea) tips at both ends.

Ecology
Especially in the turbid waters of sand channels. They serve as hosts of colonies of the eusocial snapping shrimp in the genus Synalpheus.

Distribution
Neopetrosia subtriangularis is found off the east and west coasts of Florida, the Bahamas,  and  throughout the entire Caribbean Sea.

References

Petrosina
Animals described in 1850